Selina Juul (born 7 March 1980 in Moscow, Soviet Union) is a Russian-Danish activist and graphic designer known for her work in promoting the reduction of food waste. She founded the consumer organization Stop Wasting Food in 2008. She wrote the cookbook Stop spild af mad: En kogebog med mere (Stop Wasting Food: A Cookbook with More) in 2011 and has written numerous articles on the subject of food waste. In addition to her activism, she worked as a graphic designer and illustrator.

Early life and education
Selina Juul has a BA from the Danish School of Media and Journalism (formerly known as the Graphic Arts Institute of Denmark).

Activism
Her experiences with food shortages as a child in Russia during the 1980s inspired her work combating food waste. Due to the work of the Stop Wasting Food campaign, Denmark reduced its food waste nationally by 25% in 5 years (2010-2015).

Selina Juul has received several awards for her activism. In 2013, she won the Nordic Council Environment Prize and the Danish Social Democrats' Svend Auken Prize. In 2014, she was named Dane of the Year by the newspaper Berlingske. She blogs for The Huffington Post and the Danish newspaper Politiken.

References

1980 births
Danish activists
Danish women activists
Danish bloggers
Danish women bloggers
Food writers
Living people
Naturalised citizens of Denmark
Russian emigrants to Denmark
Politiken writers
HuffPost writers and columnists
Danish graphic designers
Danish columnists
Danish women columnists
American women columnists
21st-century American women